Greenfield, Virginia may refer to:
Greenfield, Nelson County, Virginia
Greenfield, Pittsylvania County, Virginia